The 2018–19 EFL Championship (referred to as the Sky Bet Championship for sponsorship reasons) was the third season of the EFL Championship under its current name, and the twenty-seventh season under its current league structure. Norwich City were crowned champions on the final day, following a 2–1 win over Aston Villa.

Team changes
The following teams had changed division after the 2017–18 season.

Stadiums

Personnel and sponsoring

Managerial changes

League table

Play-offs

Results

Top scorers

Hat-tricks

Monthly awards

References

 
EFL Championship seasons
1
2
Eng